Charles "Charlie" Abraham Barrell (2 September 1880 – 14 January 1958) was a New Zealand politician of the Labour Party.

Biography

Early life and career
Barrell was born in Rangiora in 1880. He became a farmer but later found employment with the New Zealand Railways Department and eventually qualified as an engineer. In 1902 he married Annie Jane Malvina Quinlon. He then was the manager of branches of Booth Macdonald and Co., Ltd at New Plymouth, Auckland and Invercargill. He then became the Town Clerk and Harbourmaster at Kawhia in the Waikato. He then left Kawhia and moved to Hamilton.

Political career

He represented the Hamilton electorate from 1935, when he defeated Sir Alexander Young of the Reform Party. In , he was defeated by National's Frank Findlay. He unsuccessfully contested the Hamilton seat again in a 1945 by-election.

In 1940 he was appointed a member of the Auckland Harbour Board to fill a vacancy, but chose not to stand for re-election in 1941 stating that the war effort was taking a heavy demand on his time and he could not give warranted attention to the board's affairs.

Barrell was a Social Crediter and later became the president of the Hamilton Social Credit Association.

Later life and death
In later life he was the patron of the Waikato Trotting Club.

He died in Auckland on 14 January 1958, aged 77. He was survived by his wife, son and two daughters.

Notes

References

1880 births
1958 deaths
Auckland Harbour Board members
New Zealand Labour Party MPs
Unsuccessful candidates in the 1943 New Zealand general election
Members of the New Zealand House of Representatives
New Zealand MPs for North Island electorates
Social Credit Party (New Zealand) politicians